Tacos El Gavilan, Inc, also known as Tacos Gavilan or formerly Tacos El Gavilan, is a Mexican fast food restaurant chain founded in Los Angeles, California in 1992., Its headquarters are in Vernon, California. Tacos Gavilan serves tacos, burritos, quesadillas, sopes, tortas, platos, mulitas, nachos, large group platters, and Mexican drinks, aguas frescas, including Horchata, Tamarindo, Agua de Jamaica, and Piña. As of 2021, Tacos Gavilan has 14 restaurants located in California, all of which are family-owned.

History 
Tacos Gavilan opened its first humble taco food truck on the corner of Gage & Main in the city of Los Angeles in 1992. It offered a carne asada taco seasoning using a recipe from the founder, El Gavilan's own grandfather.

Starting with its signature dish charcoal grill carne asada tacos and steamed tortillas, Tacos Gavilan has now expanded its menu to include more Mexican cuisine food, such as sopes, tortas, mulitas, and Mexican drinks more.

It now operates 14 restaurant locations with drivethru and online pickup ordering.

Tacos Gavilan is family owned and operated.

Contests & Giveaways 
Being a family-own local business for 30 years, Tacos Gavilan is enthusiastic about sponsoring events and giveaways to give back to the community that fueled its growth.

One of the remarkable events in 2021 includes a Taco Eating Contest on the National Taco Day, October 5, 2021 to celebrate National Hispanic Heritage Month.  The Taco Eating Contest included DJ, face painting, inflatable soccer, photobooth, games and honrable guest judge, professional football player, Pablo Sisniega from the Los Angeles Football Club (LAFC). The contest also included cash prizes.

Tacos Gavilan has sponsored many social media giveaways including draws to win stadium front-row seats and field-side tickets.

Locations 
As of 2021, Tacos Gavilan owns 14 locations in Los Angeles, California.

References

External links 
Website: tacosgavilan.com

Restaurant chains
Los Angeles
Mexican-American cuisine
1992 establishments in California
Restaurants established in 1992
Mexican-American culture in California
Mexican restaurants in the United States
Restaurants in Greater Los Angeles
Regional restaurant chains in the United States
Fast-food chains of the United States